The Century was an electric car with an underslung chassis, produced by the Century Motor Company from 1911 to 1913.  The Century had tiller-operated steering, and the customer had the option of solid or pneumatic tires.  Its electrical speed controller offered a choice of six-speeds, and the series wound Westinghouse motor was geared directly to the rear axle.

Century Motor Company was renamed to the Century Electric Car company from 1913 to 1915.  Both companies operated out of Detroit, Michigan.

See also

List of defunct United States automobile manufacturers
History of the electric vehicle

Other Early Electric Vehicles
American Electric 
Argo Electric
Babcock Electric Carriage Company
Berwick
Binghamton Electric
Buffalo Electric
Columbia Automobile Company
Dayton Electric
Detroit Electric
Grinnell
Menominee
Rauch and Lang 
Riker Electric

References

External links 
 Century Electric photo, circa 1921.

Defunct motor vehicle manufacturers of the United States
Motor vehicle manufacturers based in Michigan
Electric vehicles introduced in the 20th century
Defunct manufacturing companies based in Michigan
Defunct brands